The Bishop of Ross was the ecclesiastical head of the Diocese of Ross, one of Scotland's 13 medieval bishoprics. The first recorded bishop appears in the late 7th century as a witness to Adomnán of Iona's Cáin Adomnáin. The bishopric was based at the settlement of Rosemarkie until the mid-13th century, afterwards being moved to nearby Fortrose and Fortrose Cathedral. As far as the evidence goes, this bishopric was the oldest of all bishoprics north of the Forth, and was perhaps the only Pictish bishopric until the 9th century. Indeed, the Cáin Adomnáin indicates that in the reign of Bruide mac Der Ilei, king of the Picts, the bishop of Rosemarkie was the only significant figure in Pictland other than the king. The bishopric is located conveniently close to the heartland of Fortriu, being just across the water from Moray.

However, in the High and Later Middle Ages, the bishopric was only of medium-to-low status in the Scottish church. The Bishopric's links with Rome ceased to exist after the Scottish Reformation, but continued, saving temporary abolition between 1638 and 1661, under the episcopal Church of Scotland until the Revolution of 1688. Episcopacy in the established church in Scotland was permanently abolished in 1689.

List of known bishops and abbots of Ross maic Bairend

List of known bishops of Ross

References
 Anderson, Alan Orr, Early Sources of Scottish History: AD 500–1286, 2 Vols, (Edinburgh, 1922), vol. i
 Dowden, John, The Bishops of Scotland, ed. J. Maitland Thomson, (Glasgow, 1912)
 Keith, Robert, An Historical Catalogue of the Scottish Bishops: Down to the Year 1688, (London, 1824)
 Lawrie, Sir Archibald, Early Scottish Charters Prior to A.D. 1153, (Glasgow, 1905)
 Watt, D. E. R., Fasti Ecclesiae Scotinanae Medii Aevi ad annum 1638, 2nd Draft, (St Andrews, 1969)

External links
Dauvit Broun's list of 12th century Scottish Bishops

 Bishop of Ross
12th-century establishments in Scotland
1689 disestablishments in Scotland